Ethanol, an alcohol found in nature and in alcoholic drinks, is metabolized through a complex catabolic metabolic pathway. In humans, several enzymes are involved in processing ethanol first into acetaldehyde and further into acetic acid and acetyl-CoA. Once acetyl-CoA is formed, it becomes a substrate for the citric acid cycle ultimately producing cellular energy and releasing water and carbon dioxide. Due to differences in enzyme presence and availability, human adults and fetuses process ethanol through different pathways. Gene variation in these enzymes can lead to variation in catalytic efficiency between individuals. The liver is the major organ that metabolizes ethanol due to its high concentration of these enzymes.

Human metabolic physiology

Ethanol and evolution

The average human digestive system produces approximately 3g of ethanol per day through fermentation of its contents. Catabolic degradation of ethanol is thus essential to life, not only of humans, but of all known organisms. Certain amino acid sequences in the enzymes used to oxidize ethanol are conserved (unchanged) going back to the last common ancestor over 3.5bya. Such a function is necessary because all organisms produce alcohol in small amounts by several pathways, primarily through fatty acid synthesis, glycerolipid metabolism, and bile acid biosynthesis pathways. If the body had no mechanism for catabolizing the alcohols, they would build up in the body and become toxic. This could be an evolutionary rationale for alcohol catabolism also by sulfotransferase.

Physiologic structures
A basic organizing theme in biological systems is that increasing complexity in specialized tissues and organs allows for greater specificity of function. This occurs for the processing of ethanol in the human body. The enzymes required for the oxidation reactions are confined to certain tissues. In particular, much higher concentrations of such enzymes are found in the liver, which is the primary site for alcohol catabolism. Variations in genes influence alcohol metabolism and drinking behavior.

Thermodynamic considerations

Energy thermodynamics

Energy calculations
The reaction from ethanol to carbon dioxide and water is a complex one that proceeds in at least 11 steps in humans. Below, the Gibbs free energy of formation for each step is shown with ΔGf values given in the CRC.

Complete reaction:
C2H6O(ethanol) → C2H4O(acetaldehyde) → C2H4O2(acetic acid) → acetyl-CoA → 3H2O + 2CO2.
ΔGf = Σ ΔGfp − ΔGfo

Step one
C2H6O(ethanol) + NAD+ → C2H4O(acetaldehyde) + NADH + H+
Ethanol: 
Acetaldehyde: 
ΔGf1 =  +  =  (endergonic)
ΣΔGf =  (endergonic, but this does not take into consideration the simultaneous reduction of NAD+.)

Step two
C2H4O(acetaldehyde) + NAD+ + H2O → C2H4O2(acetic acid) + NADH + H+
Acetaldehyde: 
Acetic acid: 
ΔGf2 =  +  =  (exergonic)
ΣΔGf =  +  =  (exergonic, but again this does not take into consideration the reduction of NAD+.)

Step three
C2H4O2(acetic acid) + CoA + ATP → Acetyl-CoA + AMP + PPi

ΔGf3 =

Steps 4 through 11
After this the acetyl-CoA enters the TCA cycle and is converted to 2 CO2 molecules in 8 reactions. 

Because the Gibbs energy is a state function, we can ignore all of these, and indeed can ignore even the above 3 reactions. Overall, the free energy is simply calculated from the free energy of formation of the product and reactants.

For the oxidation of acetic acid we have:
Acetic acid: 
3H2O + 2CO2: 
ΔGf4 =  +  =  (exergonic)
ΣΔGf =  −  =  (exergonic)

Discussion of calculations
If the reaction stops part way through the metabolic pathways, which happens because acetic acid is excreted in the urine after drinking, then not nearly as much energy can be derived from alcohol, indeed, only . It is also important to note that step 1 on this reaction is endothermic, requiring  of alcohol, or about 3 molecules of adenosine triphosphate (ATP) per molecule of ethanol.

Organic reaction scheme

Steps of the reaction
The first three steps of the reaction pathways lead from ethanol to acetaldehyde to acetic acid to acetyl-CoA. Once acetyl-CoA is formed, it is free to enter directly into the citric acid cycle.  However, under alcoholic conditions, the citric acid cycle has been stalled by the oversupply of NADH derived from ethanol oxidation.  The resulting backup of acetate shifts the reaction equilibrium for acetaldehyde dehydrogenase back towards acetaldehyde.  Acetaldehyde subsequently accumulates and begins to form covalent bonds with cellular macromolecules, forming toxic adducts that, eventually, lead to death of the cell.
This same excess of NADH from ethanol oxidation causes the liver to move away from fatty acid oxidation, which produces NADH, towards fatty acid synthesis, which consumes NADH.  This consequent lipogenesis is believed to account largely for the pathogenesis of alcoholic fatty liver disease.

Gene expression and ethanol metabolism

Ethanol to acetaldehyde in human adults
In human adults, ethanol is oxidized to acetaldehyde using NAD+, mainly via the hepatic enzyme alcohol dehydrogenase IB (class I), beta polypeptide (ADH1B, EC 1.1.1.1). The gene coding for this enzyme is located on chromosome 4, locus. The enzyme encoded by this gene is a member of the alcohol dehydrogenase family. Members of this enzyme family metabolize a wide variety of substrates, including ethanol, retinol, other aliphatic alcohols, hydroxysteroids, and lipid peroxidation products. This encoded protein, consisting of several homo- and heterodimers of alpha, beta, and gamma subunits, exhibits high activity for ethanol oxidation and plays a major role in ethanol catabolism. Three genes encoding alpha, beta and gamma subunits are tandemly organized in a genomic segment as a gene cluster. CYP2E1, another enzyme involved in ethanol oxidation, is upregulated by ethanol exposure, meaning that ethanol is capable of inducing its own metabolism. Ethanol has indeed been observed to be cleared more quickly by regular drinkers than non-drinkers.

Ethanol to acetaldehyde in human fetuses
In human embryos and fetuses, ethanol is not metabolized via this mechanism as ADH enzymes are not yet expressed to any significant quantity in human fetal liver (the induction of ADH only starts after birth, and requires years to reach adult levels). Accordingly, the fetal liver cannot metabolize ethanol or other low molecular weight xenobiotics. In fetuses, ethanol is instead metabolized at much slower rates by different enzymes from the cytochrome P-450 superfamily (CYP), in particular by CYP2E1. The low fetal rate of ethanol clearance is responsible for the important observation that the fetal compartment retains high levels of ethanol long after ethanol has been cleared from the maternal circulation by the adult ADH activity in the maternal liver. CYP2E1 expression and activity have been detected in various human fetal tissues after the onset of organogenesis (ca 50 days of gestation). Exposure to ethanol is known to promote further induction of this enzyme in fetal and adult tissues. CYP2E1 is a major contributor to the so-called Microsomal Ethanol Oxidizing System (MEOS) and its activity in fetal tissues is thought to contribute significantly to the toxicity of maternal ethanol consumption. In presence of ethanol and oxygen, CYP2E1 is known to release superoxide radicals and induce the oxidation of polyunsaturated fatty acids to toxic aldehyde products like 4-hydroxynonenal (HNE).

Acetaldehyde to acetic acid
At this point in the metabolic process, the ACS alcohol point system is utilized. It standardizes ethanol concentration regardless of volume, based on fermentation and reaction coordinates, cascading through the β-1,6 linkage. Acetaldehyde is a highly unstable compound and quickly forms free radical structures which are highly toxic if not quenched by antioxidants such as ascorbic acid (vitamin C) or thiamine (vitamin B1). These free radicals can result in damage to embryonic neural crest cells and can lead to severe birth defects. Prolonged exposure of the kidney and liver to these compounds in chronic alcoholics can lead to severe damage. The literature also suggests that these toxins may have a hand in causing some of the ill effects associated with hang-overs.

The enzyme associated with the chemical transformation from acetaldehyde to acetic acid is aldehyde dehydrogenase 2 family (ALDH2, EC 1.2.1.3). In humans, the gene coding for this enzyme is found on chromosome 12, locus q24.2. There is variation in this gene leading to observable differences in catalytic efficiency between people.

Acetic acid to acetyl-CoA
Two enzymes are associated with the conversion of acetic acid to acetyl-CoA. The first is acyl-CoA synthetase short-chain family member 2 ACSS2 (EC 6.2.1.1). The second enzyme is acetyl-CoA synthase 2 (confusingly also called ACSS1) which is localized in mitochondria.

Acetyl-CoA to water and carbon dioxide

Once acetyl-CoA is formed, it enters the normal citric acid cycle.

See also
 Alcohol (drug)

References

Further reading
 

Ethanol
Metabolism